A sorus (pl. sori) is a cluster of sporangia (structures producing and containing spores) in ferns and fungi. A coenosorus (plural coenosori) is a compound sorus composed of multiple, fused sori.

Etymology
This New Latin word is from Ancient Greek σωρός (sōrós 'stack, pile, heap').

Structure
In lichens and other fungi, the sorus is surrounded by an external layer.  In some red algae, it may take the form of depression into the thallus.

In ferns, the sori form a yellowish or brownish mass on the edge or underside of a fertile frond. In some species, they are protected during development by a scale or film of tissue called the indusium, which forms an umbrella-like cover.

Lifecycle significance
Sori occur on the sporophyte generation, the sporangia within producing haploid meiospores. As the sporangia mature, the indusium shrivels so that spore release is unimpeded. The sporangia then burst and release the spores.

As an aid to identification
The shape, arrangement, and location of the sori are often valuable clues in the identification of fern taxa. Sori may be circular or linear. They may be arranged in rows, either parallel or oblique to the costa, or randomly. Their location may be marginal or set away from the margin on the frond lamina. The presence or absence of indusium is also used to identify fern taxa.

Gallery

See also
 Sorocarp

References and external links

 DiversityOfLife – Fern identification tool.
 Encyclopædia Britannica: sorus 2007. Encyclopædia Britannica Online. Retrieved 20 November 2007.

Plant anatomy
Fungal morphology and anatomy
Ferns